The 2004 IIHF World U18 Championship Division III was an international under-18 ice hockey tournament run by the International Ice Hockey Federation. The Division III tournament made up the fourth level of competition at the 2004 IIHF World U18 Championships and took place between 6 and 14 March 2004 in Sofia, Bulgaria. The tournament was won by Mexico who upon winning gained promotion, along with South Africa who finished in second place, to Division II of the 2005 IIHF World U18 Championships.

Overview
The 2004 IIHF World U18 Championship Division III began on 6 March 2004 in Sofia, Bulgaria. Bosnia and Herzegovina, Israel, Mexico, New Zealand and Turkey returned to compete in the Division III competition after missing promotion at the previous years World Championships. Bulgaria and South Africa entered the Division III competition after being relegated from the Division II tournaments of the 2003 World U18 Championships. Mexico finished first after winning all six of their games and gained promotion to Division II of the 2005 IIHF World U18 Championships. South Africa who finished in second place also gained promotion to Division II and New Zealand finished in third place missing out on promotion only by goal difference. Turkey and Bosnia and Herzegovina finished in sixth and seventh place and were relegated to the 2005 IIHF World U18 Championship Division III Qualification tournament. Eduardo Glennie of Mexico finished as the tournaments top scorer after recording 20 points including 13 goals and seven assists.

Standings

Fixtures
All times local.

Scoring leaders
List shows the top ten skaters sorted by points, then goals.

References

IIHF World U18 Championship Division III
III
International ice hockey competitions hosted by Bulgaria
IIHF World U18 Championship Division III